The Fourteen Families was a term used to label and refer to the oligarchy of El Salvador during the country's period known as the "Coffee Republic" from 1871 to 1927. The families controlled most of the land in the country.

See also 
 Coffee production in El Salvador

References

Citations

General and cited references 
 

Families
History of El Salvador
Politics of El Salvador